The 1977 World Table Tennis Championships women's singles was the 34th edition of the women's singles championship.
Pak Yung-sun defeated Chang Li in the final by three sets to nil, to win the title.

Results

See also
List of World Table Tennis Championships medalists

References

-
1977 in women's table tennis